Songs About Girls is the third studio album by American singer will.i.am, known from his work with The Black Eyed Peas. The original title of the album was Keep the Beeper. The album was released on September 19, 2007. The first single released from the album was a club track titled "I Got It from My Mama" which debuted on the Billboard Hot 100 at #93 on August 17, 2007.  will.i.am enlisted guest appearances from Cheryl and Snoop Dogg. The album was recorded by Pardraic Kerin and will.i.am, and mixed by Dylan Dresdow.

Background
The album has been described by will.i.am as semi-autobiographical conceptual album "where all the songs could tell a story of falling in love, falling out of love, trying to get back in love, destructing love and destroying love and then starting a new situation. That journey is what makes this unique." The album is partially based on a seven-year relationship that will.i.am experienced and the infidelities and the break-up of that relationship. According to will.i.am's video on MySpace TV, he considers Songs About Girls to be his debut album, with his first two being production compilations.

Collaborations
will.i.am revealed on the Canadian MTV e2 show that the album would feature collaborations with: Slick Rick, Ice Cube, Q-Tip, Common, Snoop Dogg, Too Short, Busta Rhymes and Ludacris. Unfortunately, the only collaboration that made the final cut is the Snoop Dogg collaboration. Kat Graham sings in "I Got It from My Mama", "One More Chance" and "The Donque Song" but she is not credited. will.i.am also recorded a song with American R&B singer Justin Timberlake on a song called: "Going Crazy" - though never made the final album cut.

Album release
In September 2006, will.i.am became the head of marketing of the online music distribution company Musicane.  Musicane allows artists to directly sell their songs to the public without a record company overseeing the distribution of the album.  will.i.am has stated that he intends for Songs About Girls to be an infinitely expandable collection of songs that are distributed through Musicane and other online music  services. According to will.i.am; "If I have an album filled with songs about girls, what happens if tomorrow I write another song about a girl?", he explains. "So something that started off just with 15 songs, in the next ten years could have 100 songs. Having 12 songs on a record? That day is done".

Despite Will's success with The Black Eyed Peas and as a producer for numerous other artists, the album was not a commercial success. It debuted at #38 on the Billboard 200 with sales of just 21,000 copies according to Nielsen SoundScan. This was significantly less than The Black Eyed Peas' Elephunk (#14) and Monkey Business (#2) and also Fergie's solo effort The Dutchess (#2). The album leaked to the Internet on September 19, 2007. The album debuted on the Australian ARIA Albums Chart on October 1, 2007 at number 58 with sales of 870 copies. The album was released on Argentina on October 5, 2007. The album went Gold in Poland three days before its release. "Dynamite Interlude" has no writing or production credits.

Track listing
All songs produced by will.i.am, except where noted.

Samples credits
 "Over" samples "It's Over" by Electric Light Orchestra and it samples a break from T-Ski Valley's 1981 rap classic "Catch the Beat".
 "Get Your Money" samples "Body Language" by M.A.N.D.Y. and Booka Shade
 "Impatient" samples "Love Foolosophy" by Jamiroquai
 "Fantastic" samples the guitar hook played by David T. Walker in "I Want You Back" by the Jackson 5
 "S.O.S. (Mother Nature)" samples Steve Gadd's drumming in "50 Ways to Leave Your Lover" by Paul Simon
 "Mamma Mia" samples "What'd I Say" by Ray Charles

Charts and certifications

Charts

Certifications

Release history

References

External links
Official will.i.am website

2007 albums
Albums produced by Polow da Don
Albums produced by will.i.am
Will.i.am albums
Albums produced by Fernando Garibay
Albums produced by Michael Jackson